Obús is a Spanish heavy metal band founded in Madrid, Spain in 1980. They stood out because they took the risk of making a big spectacle in their concerts, to reach to the level of other international heavy metal bands. In addition, the lyrics they write and the feelings they transmit connect with the people that follow them. As they said in an interview: "All our songs, some more and some less, have a meaning". Far away from renouncing to their genre, they have always claimed that they were a heavy metal band, and they wrote a song about this genre in their first album called, "Dosis de Heavy Metal". In 2012, because of their 30th anniversary, they did a tour around Spain.

History
Early in 1980, two young men from Madrid, Juan Luis Serrano and Francisco Laguna, (bass and guitar), who had been together in other bands such as Red Box or Madrid 20, decided to form Obús.

In 1981, they won the Rock festival of Villa de Madrid, and they opened for the veteran band, Barón Rojo. Soon after, they recorded Prepárate, produced by record producer and Spanish singer Tino Casal. This first album was successful and their popularity rose. The song that gives the name to the album reached the number 1 in the 40 Principales radio station, the Spanish Top 40 chart. On 6 November 1981, the band presented the album in a massive concert at the Real Madrid stadium.

Their 1982 album, Poderoso como el Trueno (produced as well by Tino Casal), and their following release, El que Más (1984), saw a high volume of album sales. This last album was recorded with sound engineer Mark Dodson (producer of Judas Priest), and included the popular hits, "El que más", "Autopista", "La raya", "FM", "Alguien" and "Viviré". "Alguien" was written by Adrian Smith from Iron Maiden. Obús fought for the relevance of the Spanish heavy metal, giving big concerts in different festivals such as the concerts of June 1985 in the Casa de Campo, in the Spanish Communist Party (PCE) annual festival, in front of over 20,000 people.

The official live album, recorded in the pavilion of sports of Madrid on 21 February 1987 is considered their apex. It was followed by a period with ups and downs until they presented their studio album, Otra Vez En la Ruta, in 1990. The band subsequently undertook a hiatus.

During the time they were separated, Fortu joined Saratoga, a band made up by veteran rock musicians from bands such as Barón Rojo, Muro and Santa. A band with former members of such successful bands was thought to be impossible at the time, however, the collaboration between members gave birth to one of the best bands in the Spanish metal scene. The first album they wrote, Saratoga, (same name as the band) managed to bring a full house to the Sala Agualung, in Madrid, one of the most popular live music venues in the Spanish capital. After recording their second album, Tributo, Fortu decided to leave the band. Meanwhile, Serrano and Fernando had started his own rock band, called Venganza, but they did not generate much acclaim. Paco, in the other hand, was trying to convince his past companions to revive the band. Just a week after Fortu abandoned his band Saratoga, Venganza decided to split and Obús was revived in 1996.

Originally scheduled to take place at a festival in which Panzer and Judas Priest were also to perform, the deal fell through. However, they decided to go on tour on their own. At the time, the heavy metal scene in Spain was falling out of grace, and younger generations grew interested in older bands. Because of this, Obús found a receptive audience. Due to the success of the tour, they start thinking of recording a new album.  In October 2000, the band released Desde el fondo del abismo.

In 2004, during the tour "Segundos fuera", Serrano left the band and Peter Oteo replaced him. They incorporated Nacho GG-R as bassist to the band. In 2008, Fernando experienced heath issues which led him to leave the band, being replaced by Carlos Mirat. In 2009, during a tour around South America, Nacho GG-R left the band and Pepe Bao (bassist of O'funk'illo) substituted him.

Discography
 Prepárate (1981)
 Poderoso como el trueno (1982)
 El que más (1984)
 Pega con fuerza (1985)
 Dejarse la piel (1986)
 En directo 21-2-87 (1987) (Live)
 Otra vez en la ruta (1990)
 Desde el fondo del abismo (2000)
 Segundos fuera (2003)
 Vamos muy bien (2006)
 Cállate! (2010)
 De Madrid al Infierno (2012) (Live)
 Sirena de metal (2014)
 Con un par!! (2019)

Members
From 1980 to 1981
 Juan Luis Serrano (Bass), (Vocals)
 Francisco Laguna (Guitar), (Vocals)
 Manolo Caño (Drummer)
 From 1981 to 1991 and from 1996 to 2004
 Fructuoso "Fortu" Sánchez (Lead vocals)
 Juan Luis Serrano (Bass) (Background vocals)
 Francisco Laguna (Guitar) (Background vocals)
 Fernando Sánchez (Drummer) (Background vocals)
 From 2004 to 2010
 Fructuoso "Fortu" Sánchez (Lead vocals)
 Peter Oteo – Nacho García – Pepe Bao (Bass) (Background vocals)
 Francisco Laguna (Guitar) (Background vocals)
 Fernando Sánchez – Carlos Mirat (Drummer) (Background vocals)
From 2010 until present
 Fructuoso "Fortu" Sánchez (Lead vocals)
 Paco Laguna (Guitar) (Background vocals)
 Fernando Montesinos (Bass) (Background vocals)
 Carlos Mirat (Drummer) (Background vocals)

References

External links
 Official website (In Spanish)
 Obús biography (In Spanish) 
 Interview in 'La Factoría del Ritmo' (2001) (In Spanish)

Spanish heavy metal musical groups
Musical groups established in 1981
Musical groups from Madrid